Macrina may refer to:
Saint Macrina the Elder (before 270 – c. 340), saint and mother and grandmother of several saints, patron saint of widows
Saint Macrina the Younger, (324 – 379), daughter of Saint Basil the Elder and granddaughter of the above
Măcrina, a village in Puieşti Commune, Buzău County, Romania
 Macrina (insect), a genus of shield bugs in the tribe Phyllocephalini